Statistics of Kuwaiti Premier League in the 1977–78 season.

Overview
Al Qadisiya Kuwait won the championship.

References
RSSSF

1977–78
1977–78 in Asian association football leagues
football